Richard Olivier (9 August 1945 – 3 March 2021) was a Belgian filmmaker and documentarian.

Filmography

Short films
I’m Fed Up with Bananas (1970)
Sheep as Far as You Can See (1971)
The Tapdancer (1973)
Phantasma (1975)
Violent Mass (1975)
The Motor Cyclist of the Apocalypse (1977)
Plato (1980)
The End (1982)
The Fantastic Goal-Scorer (1983)
Splendour and Decadence of a Department Store (1985)
Marvin Gaye Transit Ostende (1989)
Black, Yellow and Red (1990)
Heavy Harted (1998)
The Convicted Judge (1999)
The Solitary of the Ventoux Mountain (2003)

Full-length films
The Charm of Ambiguity (1974)
The Apprentice Idols (1978)
Strip School (1980)
Black Paris (1981)
Rebel Songs (1984)
Kitsch Belgium (1990)
Love Songs (1991)
Wilchar, Black Tears (1992)
The King's Fools (1993)
Women Chants (1993)
Marchienne, or Where to Live a Dot's Live (1993)
Dutroux Dead-Holes (1996)
A Summer in Droixhe
Skin Sorrow (1997)
Love Pains (1999)
What Women Told Me (2002)
Remember Marvin Gaye
Dialogues with the Hereafter (2003)
Ordinary Murders of Little Importance (2004)
The Misfits of Faith (2006)
Esther Forever (2007)

References

1945 births
2021 deaths
Belgian documentary filmmakers
Mass media people from Brussels